Alex Reed Singleton (born December 7, 1993) is an American football linebacker for the Denver Broncos of the National Football League (NFL). He played college football at Montana State and was signed as an undrafted free agent by the Seattle Seahawks after the 2015 NFL Draft. He also previously played for the New England Patriots, Minnesota Vikings, Calgary Stampeders, and Philadelphia Eagles.

Professional career

Seattle Seahawks
Singleton was signed as an undrafted rookie free agent by Seattle on May 8, 2015.  He signed a three-year contract worth $1,578,500 and received a $3,500 signing bonus.  On September 5, he was released.

New England Patriots
Three days later, Singleton was signed to the Patriots' practice squad.  He was released on September 15, 2015.

Minnesota Vikings
Singleton was signed to the Vikings' practice squad on December 22, 2015. He was released on April 13, 2016.

Calgary Stampeders (CFL)
Singleton was drafted by the Calgary Stampeders with the sixth overall pick in the 2016 CFL Draft. He had acquired a Canadian passport in October 2015, having qualified for dual citizenship because his mother was born in Toronto. Under then-recently implemented CFL rules, Singleton's Canadian citizenship automatically qualified him to be counted as a Canadian "national" player – previously, players who did not play a meaningful part of their amateur football careers in Canada were counted as "international" players even if they were Canadian citizens. Singleton signed with the team on May 17, 2016. He made his CFL debut on June 25, 2016, against the BC Lions.

Singleton had an exceptional first season in the CFL and quickly became one of the Stampeders important players on defense. Over the course of the season, he played in all 18 regular season games, and the Stamps two playoff games. He contributed 65 defensive tackles, 9 special teams tackles, and 3 forced fumbles.

On November 1, 2017, Singleton was announced as the team's nominee for the CFL's most outstanding defensive player, most outstanding Canadian and most outstanding player awards, including sweeping all votes in the defensive and Canadian player categories. His 121 tackles going into week 20 of the CFL season were already the most in Calgary Stampeders history.

Singleton's 2018 season matched the previous year in tackles with 123. Although he recorded no sacks, Singleton did add 6 special teams tackles for the Stamps, as well as 2 forced fumbles and was named to his second CFL All-Star team. On January 7, Singleton was released by the Stampeders so he could pursue NFL opportunities.

Philadelphia Eagles

On January 7, 2019, Singleton, signed with the Philadelphia Eagles of the National Football League, along with CFL teammate Marken Michel.

Singleton played in all four preseason games for the Eagles, and contributed with 28 defensive tackles and one forced fumble. He was waived during final roster cuts on August 30, 2019, but was re-signed to the team's practice squad the next day. On October 16, 2019, Singleton was promoted to the active roster following the release of linebacker Zach Brown. He played in 10 games, only on special teams.

In Week 4 of 2020 against the San Francisco 49ers on Sunday Night Football, Singleton went into the game on defense due to an injury to T. J. Edwards. With less than 6 minutes remaining in the game, Singleton recorded his first career interception off a pass thrown by Nick Mullens and returned it for a 30-yard touchdown during the 25–20 win. By week 6, Singleton became a starting linebacker for the Eagles. In Week 11 against the Cleveland Browns, Singleton led the team with 12 tackles, sacked Baker Mayfield once, and recovered a fumble lost by Mayfield during the 22–17 loss. In Week 17 against the Washington Football Team on Sunday Night Football, Singleton led the team with 14 tackles and sacked Alex Smith once during the 20–14 loss. Overall, Singleton played in all regular season games with 11 starts and led the Eagles in tackles at 120. As a result, he earned an additional $464,296 through performance-based pay.

On March 1, the Eagles placed a one-year exclusive-rights free agent tender on Singleton, which he signed on March 25, 2021. On September 6, it was announced that he was voted by his teammates to be a team captain for the 2021 season. After initially playing at the starting linebacker position, he was relegated to backup and replaced by Davion Taylor in week 6. He was put back into the starting position in week 12 after an injury to Taylor. In week 16 against the New York Giants, he caught an interception off a deflection from Rodney McLeod and returned it for a 29-yard touchdown, his second career pick-6. He was placed on the COVID list on January 3, 2022. He was activated one week later on January 10, missing just one game where the Eagles did not play their starters as they had already clinched a playoff spot. Singleton finished the season as the team's leading tackler for the 2nd year in a row with 137, the most in a single season by any Eagle since Byron Evans in 1992. In the wild card game against the Buccaneers, Singleton led the team in tackles with 16, which included 4 tackles for loss and one sack in the 31-15 loss.

Denver Broncos
On March 18, 2022, Singleton signed a one-year contract with the Denver Broncos reportedly worth $1.1 million guaranteed with $750k in playing time incentives. The move reunited him with quarterback Russell Wilson, whom Singleton had formed a relationship with during his short stint in Seattle. 

On October 17, 2022, during a Week 6 game against the Los Angeles Chargers, Singleton recorded 19 solo tackles and a total of 21 combined tackles in the 19-16 overtime loss. His 19 solo tackles tied Derrick Brooks for the second-most solo tackles in a single game in NFL history. Despite an underwhelming season for the Broncos, Singleton had a career year, ranking 5th in combined tackles during the season with 163.

On March 13, 2023, Singleton signed a three-year, $18 million contract extension with $9 million guaranteed.

Statistics

Regular season

Postseason

References

External links
Philadelphia Eagles bio
Minnesota Vikings bio
Montana State Bobcats bio

1993 births
Living people
People from Thousand Oaks, California
Players of American football from California
Sportspeople from Ventura County, California
American sportspeople of Canadian descent
Canadian Football League Most Outstanding Defensive Player Award winners
American football linebackers
Canadian football linebackers
American players of Canadian football
Montana State Bobcats football players
Seattle Seahawks players
New England Patriots players
Minnesota Vikings players
Calgary Stampeders players
Philadelphia Eagles players
Denver Broncos players